The 1985 Grand Prix motorcycle racing season was the 37th F.I.M. Road Racing World Championship season.

Season summary
Honda's Freddie Spencer gave a dominating performance becoming the first man to win the 250 and 500 championships in the same year. Defending champion Eddie Lawson finished in second with former 250 world champion, Christian Sarron coming in third. Sarron's victory at the German Grand Prix would mark the first 500cc Grand Prix victory for a non-American rider since the 1982 Swedish Grand Prix. Australian Wayne Gardner showed promise with a fourth-place finish for Honda.

With perennial champion Angel Nieto moving to the 80cc class, the 125 class was left open for his Garelli teammate, Fausto Gresini to clinch the title, giving the Italian team its fourth consecutive championship. Swiss Stefan Dörflinger would take his fourth consecutive title in the 80cc class. Angel Nieto won his 90th and final Grand Prix victory in the 80cc round in France, at the time second only to Giacomo Agostini, but since surpassed by Valentino Rossi.

1985 Grand Prix season calendar
The following Grands Prix were scheduled to take place in 1985:

†† = Saturday race

Calendar changes
 The Nations Grand Prix was moved back, from 15 April to 26 May and it was moved from the Circuito Internazionale Santa Monica to the Mugello Circuit, while the San Marino Grand Prix moved from the Mugello Circuit to the Circuito Internazionale Santa Monica.
 The German Grand Prix moved from the Nürburgring to the Hockenheimring.
 The French Grand Prix was moved back, from 11 June to 21 July and it was moved from the Paul Ricard circuit to the Bugatti Circuit in Le Mans.

Results and standings

Grands Prix

Participants

500cc participants

250cc participants

500cc riders' standings

Scoring system
Points are awarded to the top ten finishers. A rider has to finish the race to earn points.